The 2004–05 Mestis season was the fifth season of the Mestis, the second level of ice hockey in Finland. 12 teams participated in the league, and KalPa won the championship.

Standings

Playoffs

Qualification

No teams were relegated as FPS and Jokipojat retained their places in Mestis.

External links
 Season on hockeyarchives.info

Fin
2004–05 in Finnish ice hockey
Mestis seasons